Complete Control Recording Sessions is a live EP by Scream. It was recorded at Dave Grohl's Studio 606 in February 2011 It is the second in SideOneDummy's series The Complete Control Sessions. It was released digitally and on vinyl on August 16, 2011. The artwork is by El Jefe Designs.

The track "Get Free" is featured on the 2012 film Ted.

Track listing

Credits
Peter Stahl – vocals
Franz Stahl – guitar
Clint Walsh – guitar
Skeeter Thompson – bass
Kent Stax – drums

References

Scream (band) albums
2011 EPs
SideOneDummy Records EPs